Malawi competed at the 1992 Summer Olympics in Barcelona, Spain.

Competitors
The following is the list of number of competitors in the Games.

Athletics

Men

Women

References

Sources
Official Olympic Reports

Nations at the 1992 Summer Olympics
1992
Oly